The Phalacridae are a family of beetles commonly called the shining flower beetles, They are often found in composite flowers. They are oval-shaped, usually tan, and aboout 2 mm in length. Most species feed on fungus, although a number feed on flower heads.

Worldwide there are about 638 species in 52 genera. The oldest possible record of the family is a specimen from Spanish amber, dating to the Albian stage of the Early Cretaceous.

Taxonomy

This family includes the following subfamily:
 Phaenocephalinae Matthews, 1899
 Phalacrinae Leach, 1815

Genera within this family include:

 Phaenocephalus-group
 Phaenocephalus Wollaston, 1873
 Phalacrinus Blackburn, 1891
 Ranomafanacrinus Gimmel, 2013
 Stilbus-group
 Acylomus Sharp, 1888
 Nesiotus Guillebeau, 1896
 Stilbus Seidlitz, 1872
 Xanthocomus Guillebeau, 1893
 Pseudolibrus-group
 Litostilbus Guillebeau, 1894
 Megistopalpus Guillebeau, 1895
 Pseudolibrus Flach, 1889
 Phalacrus-group
 Phalacropsis Casey, 1890
 Phalacrus Paykull, 1800
 Olibroporus-group
 Austroporus Gimmel, 2013
 Olibroporus Casey, 1890
 Platyphalacrus Gimmel, 2013
 Pycinus Guillebeau, 1893
 Ochrolitus-group
 Ochrolitus Sharp, 1889
 Sveculus Gimmel, 2013
 Olibrus-group
 Olibrus Erichson, 1845
 Tolyphus Erichson, 1845
 Olibrosoma-group
 Antennogasmus Gimmel, 2013
 Malagasmus Gimmel, 2013
 Olibrosoma Tournier, 1889
 Litochropus-group
 Litochropus Casey, 1890
 Neolitochrus Gimmel, 2013
 Genera incertae sedis
 Apallodes Reitter, 1873
 Augasmus Motschulsky, 1858
 Entomocnemus Guillebeau, 1894
 Eulitrus Sharp, 1889
 Grouvelleus Guillebeau, 1892
 Litochrus Erichson, 1845
 Malagophytus Gimmel, 2013
 Paracylomus Gimmel, 2013

References

 
Cucujoidea families
Articles containing video clips